Melissa Chimenti (born 1948 in Asmara, Eritrea as Maria Rosa Chimenti) aka Melissa, is an Italian actress and singer. Her father was Italian and her mother was Eritrean. Her best-known role is Papaya in the film Papaya, Love Goddess of the Cannibals, directed by Joe D'Amato.

Discography

Singles 

1968: La spiaggia è vuota/Le fragole (Decca, FI 713)
1969: Ricordati di me/Tam tam (Parade, PRC 5069)
1969: Balla ancora insieme a me/Ricordati di me (Parade, PRC 5078)
1971: Apparizione/Dove muore la città (Produttori Associati, PA/NP 3178)
Luglio 1973: Quel sorriso nelle sue mani/Che fai! (Erre, RR 3062)
1980: Un po' gay/Jimmy (Blitz Record, BLZ 021)
1985: Deliverer of my mind (Vocal version)/Deliverer of my mind (Instrumental version) (Full Time Records, FTM 31567; recorded as Kwin Melissa)
1986: Egyptian ring/Bad loser (Five Record, FM NP 13123; recorded as Kwin Melissa)

Filmography
Le mille e una notte... e un'altra ancora! (1972)
Rivelazioni di uno psichiatra sul mondo perverso del sesso, (1973)
Chino (1973) 
Farfallon (1974) 
Carambola! (1974) 
Papaya, Love Goddess of the Cannibals (also known as Papaya dei Caraibi), by Joe D'Amato (1978) (credited as Melissa)
Gardenia, il giustiziere della mala (1979)

References

External links
 

1948 births
Italian film actresses
Living people
Italian people of Eritrean descent
People from Asmara
20th-century Italian actresses
20th-century Italian women singers